Alexandru Cheltuială (born 5 February 1983) is a Moldovan football player for FC Zimbru Chișinău as a defender. He has also played for the Moldova national team.

External links
 Official FC Olimpia Bălți profile
 
 UEFA profile

1983 births
Living people
Footballers from Chișinău
CSF Bălți players
Association football defenders
Moldovan footballers
Moldova international footballers